Michael David Faist (born January 5, 1992) is an American actor. An alumnus of the American Musical and Dramatic Academy, Faist is the recipient of a Grammy and an Emmy, with nominations for a Tony and a British Academy Film Award.

Faist began his acting career in 2011 originating the role of Morris Delancey in Disney's Newsies, appearing in its Broadway production (2012–2013). He continued to appear in several independent films, television series and starring in Off-Broadway productions before his breakthrough originating the role of Connor Murphy in the Broadway musical Dear Evan Hansen (2015–2018), for which he was nominated for the Tony Award for Best Featured Actor in a Musical and won the Grammy Award for Best Musical Theatre Album and the Daytime Emmy Award for Outstanding Musical Performance in a Daytime Program.

In 2021, Faist starred in the series Panic and had his first major film part as Riff, the leader of the Jets, in Steven Spielberg's West Side Story, for which he received critical acclaim and a nomination for the BAFTA Award for Best Actor in a Supporting Role.

Early life and education
Michael David Faist was born on January 5, 1992, in Gahanna, Ohio, and was adopted by his parents, Julia and Kurt Faist. The family owns a real estate business. As a child, Faist realized he wanted to pursue a career in the performing arts. He was enticed by dancing after seeing Gene Kelly and Fred Astaire in old MGM films, especially Kelly in Singin' in the Rain. "Just the way he performed and moved, he was able to tell a story through movement," Faist said. At the age of 5, he pressured his parents to enroll him in dance classes and began auditioning for community theater and children's theater. In a Columbus Children's Theatre production of The Wizard of Oz, he played one of the Lollipop Guild, later joining the cast of Oliver! and Alice in Wonderland. Faist fell in love with acting while attending The Academy of Performing Arts (TAPA) company in Columbus, Ohio and while at Gahanna Lincoln High School he acted in several productions, such as Danny Zuko in Grease and Simon in Jesus Christ Superstar. At the age of 17, Faist met his birth mother and her family, who are mostly pilots by profession. The eldest of his two half-brothers taught him how to fly. Faist has since then obtained his pilot's license.

In 2009, he graduated high school and moved to New York to pursue a stage career. He enrolled the American Musical and Dramatic Academy but dropped out after two semesters. While auditioning for Off-Broadway plays, he began selling tickets in Times Square. On his first job as a professional actor in the play White Christmas, he was collecting food stamps, earning $150 per week, and living in the back of a McDonald's parking lot.

Career

2011–2014
Faist began his acting career in 2011, originating the role of Morris Delancey, a bully and publisher Joseph Pulitzer's henchman, in the regional premiere of Newsies at the Paper Mill Playhouse. When the musical transferred to Broadway, he understudied the lead role of Jack Kelly, a newsboy who leads his colleagues in a strike against the publisher, in addition to his other roles. Faist had to alternately play the roles in quick succession during the opening number. "You have to really make sure you're warmed up vocally and physically and you're mentally prepared," Faist said of the demands of his dual role, but added, "It's not hard to have fun in Newsies, about the uprising of children, a new generation coming in to take over the old." Newsies opened to critical acclaim and was nominated for Best Musical at the 66th Tony Awards. In 2012, he made his feature film debut in the coming-of-age drama The Unspeakable Act. The independent film received positive reviews.

Faist went on to star as Rhys Thurston in Branden Jacobs-Jenkins's play Appropriate Off-Broadway in 2014, which drew critical acclaim from chief theater critic Ben Brantley of The New York Times. In 2015, he appeared as Skip in the short film Yellow, a psychiatric ward patient in Touched with Fire, and Gordie Joiner in The Grief of Others which received critical and generally positive reviews. He was also cast in an unaired pilot of the series Eye Candy as Olsen and co-starred as tutor Aleksei Belyaev opposite Peter Dinklage in an Off-Broadway production of A Month in the Country.

2015–2020
In August 2015, he originated the role of Connor Murphy in the hit musical Dear Evan Hansen, playing the role of the drug addict from the workshop till its Broadway transfer in 2016. The musical received critical acclaim and earned Faist a Tony Award nomination for Best Actor in a Featured Role in a Musical. Along with his cast members, he also won the Grammy Award for Best Musical Theater Album and the Daytime Emmy Award for Outstanding Musical Performance in a Daytime Program for their performance of You Will Be Found on The Today Show. Of his process for developing his character, a suicidal high school student, Faist said that he "read stories by real survivors on a website, livethroughthis.org. I realized that there seems to be a general lack of self-love and empathy in our society. I hope that when people see the show, they'll say, 'Oh, I am loved. I'm exactly who I am, and I am enough'." Along with cast members Ben Levi Ross and Mallory Bechtel, Faist lent his voice for the audiobook version of Val Emmich's Dear Evan Hansen: The Novel, a book adaptation of the musical released in October 2018.

The two following years, Faist continued to feature in small independent films the likes of Our Time, I Can I Will I Did and Active Adults. He also appeared in crime procedural dramas Law & Order Special Victims Unit in a 2017 episode as Glenn Lawrence. In October 2017, he taught Improv and acting exercises in a Broadway Musical Theatre Workshop and also held a Master Class for audition technique and song interpretation. He taught the same class in Montreal that November.

In 2018, he appeared in an episode of Deception and starred in the Second Stage Theater production of Days of Rage as Spence, a conflicted and passionate young man torn between causes and women. He also appeared in the horror-fantasy film Wildling opposite Bel Powley. It premiered at South by Southwest to mixed reviews. In 2020, he played a starring role as Arthur in the small independent drama The Atlantic City Story.

2021–present
In 2021, Faist co-starred as Dodge Mason in the Amazon's teen drama thriller Panic. The New York Times spoke of Faist, describing him as tall and lanky, making quite a striking figure in the series, "With a slender charisma and a bone structure that seems to have been sculpted with a scythe, the actor could easily have embarked on Panic. But his sensitivity is closer to that of leading men as atypical as Adam Driver, and he modernizes a potentially versatile piece." Despite receiving positive reviews from critics, the series was canceled after one season. Faist received a nomination for his work by the Critics Choice Association in the category Best Actor in an Action Series at the 2nd Critics' Choice Super Awards.

Later that year, he had his first major movie role in Steven Spielberg's film adaptation of West Side Story as Riff, Tony's best friend and leader of the Jets gang. The film was a critical success and some critics deemed it superior to the 1961 film. His performance earned universal praise from critics. The Washington Post regards his magnetic performance as West Side Story's "stand-out" as its chief film critic Ann Hornaday wrote "The revelation in this production, however, is Mike Faist, who is not only a gifted singer and dancer, but plays Jets gang leader Riff with just the right mix of spiky resentment, hair-trigger anger and loose-limbed grace.". Critic Pete Hammond of Deadline agreed, writing "But the real revelation of this cast is Faist, a  Tony nominee for Dear Evan Hansen who just pops and explodes as Riff. With this performance we are watching the birth of a true star, the kind of actor you can't look away from. In fact, I felt a definite sense of loss once he is out of the picture. He's riveting." On his collaboration with Faist, screenwriter Tony Kushner says, "He really wants to think about economics, politics, psychology, and psychotechnology, and he feeds himself with a kind of acuity and precision that I think is the mark of a great actor." To craft a new version of the iconic Jets leader, Faist took inspiration from a 1959 Bruce Davidson photography book entitled Brooklyn Gang. "You look at those photos and you see these people, the nihilism that exists, their inability to see past tomorrow, or even today for that matter. There's something depressing about it, also carnal, wild, and primal," Faist explained. For his performance, Faist received a nomination for Best Actor in a Supporting Role at the 75th British Academy Film Awards.

Upcoming projects
Faist has three upcomings projects. In February 2022, it was announced that he would join Zendaya and Josh O'Connor to star in Luca Guadagnino's Challengers as Art, a famed tennis player facing his rival. Faist will also portray photographer Danny Lyon in Jeff Nichols' The Bikeriders opposite Austin Butler, Jodie Comer and Tom Hardy. Faist will make his West End debut in the stage adaptation of Brokeback Mountain as Jack Twist in May 2023.

Work as a writer
Faist writes short stories and has stated that it is important for an actor to write in order to understand scripts. He helped to establish a playwright's festival, the Ohio Artists Gathering, which he described as "a one-week theater festival bringing artists from New York and LA and integrating them with local actors, writers, and directors". The first festival was held in Columbus, Ohio in 2018.

Acting credits

Film

Television

Theatre

Soundtrack

Cast album

Awards and nominations

References

External links
 
 

1992 births
Living people
21st-century American male actors
American adoptees
American male film actors
American male musical theatre actors
American male stage actors
American male television actors
Daytime Emmy Award winners
Grammy Award winners
Male actors from Ohio
People from Franklin County, Ohio
American male dancers
American Musical and Dramatic Academy alumni